I Adore You may refer to:

Film
 I Adore You (film), a 1933 lost British film

Music

Albums
I Adore You, or the title song, by Daniël Sahuleka, 1993
I Adore You, by Sahar Taha, 2012

Songs
"I Adore You" (song), by Queenadreena, 2000
"I Adore U", by Adore Delano, 2014
"I Adore You", by Action Bronson from Blue Chips 2, 2013
"I Adore You", by Air Supply, 2015
"I Adore You", by Alek Sandar, 2015
"I Adore You", by Caron Wheeler from Beach of the War Goddess, 1993
"I Adore You", by Doro Pesch from Calling the Wild, 2000
"I Adore You", by Esperanza Spalding from Esperanza, 2008
"I Adore You", by Goldie from The Journey Man, 2017
"I Adore You", by Jill Scott from Golden Moments, 2015
"I Adore You", by Melpo Mene from Bring the Lions Out, 2008
"I Adore You", by Patti Page from Love After Midnight, 1964
"I Adore You", by Phil Joel, 2002
"I Adore You", by Phil Wickham from Phil Wickham, 2006
"I Adore You", by Tone Lōc from Cool Hand Lōc, 1991
"I Adore You", from the film Aladdin, 1958

See also

Adore You (disambiguation)
"Adoro" (song), a 1967 Spanish song by Armando Manzanero